The 2015 MTV EMAs (also known as the MTV Europe Music Awards) were held at the Mediolanum Forum in Assago, near Milan, Italy, on 25 October 2015. This was the third time the awards have taken place in Italy, second time Milan has been the host city, and the first (and so far, the only) time that the awards have been held in October. The awards was held in the same venue as the 1998 MTV EMAs. On 30 September 2015, it was announced that singer Ed Sheeran would host the awards, along with actress Ruby Rose.

Justin Bieber won six awards, including Best Male and Best Worldwide Act.
	
Throughout mid-2015, Milan also hosted Expo 2015, a partner of this year's awards.

In association with the EMAs, MTV Italia organised an event called MTV Music Week, which ran from 19 October to 25 October. In addition, on the nights of 24 and 25 October, two concerts were held in Piazza del Duomo, Milan, one of which was related to MTV World Stage. International and Italian acts performed on both nights, including Ellie Goulding, Marco Mengoni, Duran Duran, Martin Garrix and Afrojack.

Nominations
Winners are in bold text.

Regional nominations
Winners are in bold text.

Europe

Africa

Asia

Australia and New Zealand

Latin America

North America

Worldwide nominations
Winners are in bold text.

Best European Act
 Agir
 Astrid S
 Black M
 Daniel Kajmakoski
 Dimitri Vegas & Like Mike
Eliad
 Giorgos Mazonakis
 Inna
 JVG
 Kensington
 Lena Meyer-Landrut
 Little Mix
 Lukas Graham
 Marco Mengoni
 Margaret
 MBAND
 Stefanie Heinzmann
 Sweet California
 The Fooo Conspiracy

Best African and Indian Act
 Diamond Platnumz
Priyanka Chopra

Best Asian Act
 Dempagumi.inc
 BTS
 Sơn Tùng M-TP
 Jane Zhang
 Jay Chou

Best Australian and New Zealand Act
5 Seconds of Summer
Savage

Best Latin America Act
 Anitta
 Axel
 J Balvin
 Mario Bautista

Best North America Act
 Justin Bieber
 Taylor Swift

Performances

Appearances
Shay Mitchell and Ashley Benson — presented Best Male
Novak Djokovic — presented Best Hip-Hop
Hailey Baldwin, Bianca Balti and Tinie Tempah — presented Best Video
Mark Ronson - presented Best Live
Ruby Rose — presented Best North America Act
Ruby Rose — presented Video Visionary Award
Martin Garrix and Charli XCX — presented Best Collaboration
Fifth Harmony — presented Best Look
Laura Whitmore - presented Biggest Fans

Voting process

See also 
 2015 MTV Video Music Awards
 Expo 2015

References

External links
Official website 

2015 in Italy
mtv
2010s in Milan
2015